Katja Keul (née Fehsenfeld, born 30 November 1969) is a German lawyer and politician of Alliance 90/The Greens who has been serving as a member of the German Bundestag since the 2009 elections, representing the Nienburg II – Schaumburg district. In addition to her work in parliament, she has been Minister of State at the Federal Foreign Office in the government of Chancellor Olaf Scholz since 8 December 2021.

Education and early career
The daughter of a development aid worker, Keul was born in Berlin. She attended schools in Mostaganem, Höxter, Geneva, Jacksonville, Florida, and Nienburg/Weser. From 1989 to 1994 she studied law at the University of Heidelberg and has been working as a lawyer since 1997.

Political career
Keul has been a member of the Green Party since 2006.

Keul has been a member of the German Bundestag since the 2013 elections, representing the Nienburg II – Schaumburg constituency. In parliament, she served on the Committee on Legal Affairs and the Committee on Defense from 2013 until 2021. During that time, she served as her parliamentary group's spokesperson on legal affairs. From 2014 until 2017, she was also part of the parliament's Council of Elders, which – among other duties – determines daily legislative agenda items and assigns committee chairpersons based on party representation. Following the 2017 elections, she joined the Subcommittee on Disarmament, Arms Control and Non-Proliferation.

In addition to her committee assignments, Keul is a member of the German-American Parliamentary Friendship Group. She has been a member of the German delegations to the Parliamentary Assembly of the Organization for Security and Co-operation in Europe since 2014 and to the Franco-German Parliamentary Assembly since 2019.

On 7 June 2011, Keul was among the guests invited to the state dinner hosted by President Barack Obama in honor of Chancellor Angela Merkel at the White House.

In 2019, Keul co-founded a cross-party support group for the Treaty on the Prohibition of Nuclear Weapons.

In the negotiations to form a so-called traffic light coalition of the Social Democratic Party (SPD), the Green Party and the Free Democratic Party (FDP) following the 2021 German elections, Keul was part of her party's delegation in the working group on children, youth and families, co-chaired by Serpil Midyatli, Katrin Göring-Eckardt and Stephan Thomae.

Other activities
 German Foundation for Peace Research (DSF), Ex-Officio Member of the Board (since 2022)
 German Federal Cultural Foundation, Ex-Officio Member of the Board of Trustees (since 2022)
 German Bar Association (DAV), Member
  EastWest Institute, Member of the Parliamentarians Network for Conflict Prevention
 German Cyclist's Association (ADFC), Member
 German Federation for the Environment and Nature Conservation (BUND), Member
 German Foundation for International Legal Cooperation (IRZ), Member
 International Association of Lawyers against Nuclear Arms (IALANA), Member

Political positions
In 2014, Keul – alongside fellow Green Party parliamentarians Claudia Roth and Hans-Christian Ströbele – lodged a complaint before the Federal Constitutional Court of Germany, arguing that it was unconstitutional for the government to keep the Bundestag in the dark about planned arms deals because it prevented the parliament from fulfilling its role of keeping the government in check. The court ruled that while the government did not have to disclose information about planned defense exports, it did have an obligation to provide the Bundestag with details, on request, once specific arms deals had been approved.

In 2016, Keul and Volker Beck submitted a compensatory draft law to all parliamentary groups in the German Parliament, urging them to remove Paragraph 175 in the penal code, which criminalized homosexual acts.

References 

German women lawyers
20th-century German lawyers
21st-century German women politicians
1969 births
Living people
Members of the Bundestag 2021–2025
Members of the Bundestag 2017–2021
Members of the Bundestag 2013–2017
Members of the Bundestag 2009–2013
Members of the Bundestag for Alliance 90/The Greens
21st-century German lawyers